Brother Isle ( meaning broad beach island) is a small, uninhabited island in Shetland, Scotland. It lies between the islands of Yell and Shetland Mainland.

Geography and geology 
The island's rock is "undifferentiated moine gneiss and quartzite."

History 
It is sometimes assumed that the "Brother" in the name refers to Culdees/papar who were frequent inhabitants of the smaller islands, however, in this case there is no apparent evidence for this claim, and it would appear to be merely folk etymology.

At only 40 hectares in size (about 1/6 of a sq. mile) and surrounded by tidal rips which make landing difficult, it would seem unlikely that the island has ever been inhabited. However, Brother Isle was inhabited until the 1820s, latterly by brothers with the surname Tulloch. This led to the mistaken assumption that the island's name referred to them.

In 2004, a lighthouse was built on the island.

References 

Uninhabited islands of Shetland
Former populated places in Scotland